Gerris comatus is a species of water strider in the family Gerridae. It is found in North America.

Subspecies
These two subspecies belong to the species Gerris comatus:
 Gerris comatus comatus Drake & Hottes, 1925
 Gerris comatus mickeli Drake & Hottes, 1925

References

Articles created by Qbugbot
Insects described in 1925
Gerrini